Pineland may refer to:

Pineland, Florida, USA
Pineland, Texas, USA
Pineland Archeological District, a U.S. historic district located on Pine Island, near Pineland, Florida, USA
Pineland Farms, a former hospital, now parks and buildings, located in New Gloucester, Maine, USA
People's Republic of Pineland, a fictitious country located in North Carolina, USA where U.S. Army Special Forces trainees are tested in their ability to work with guerrillas in an unconventional warfare environment
 The Pineland – a plantation in South Carolina, U.S.

See also
Pinelands